Tagoloan is the name of three places in the Philippines:

Tagoloan, Lanao del Norte
Tagoloan, Lanao del Sur (also known as Tagoloan II)
Tagoloan, Misamis Oriental